Thamarai is a 1994 Tamil language drama film directed and produced by K. K. Rajsirpy. The film stars Napoleon, Rupini and Rohini. It was released on 19 August 1994.

Plot

According to the prophecy, Kali temple has to be shifted in Madurai Veeran temple's place. This prophecy creates troubles between the two communities of the village. In the meantime, Thamarai (Napoleon) comes back from jail to help the "Madurai Veeran" community against the vicious village chief Subbarayan (Rajesh).

Five years back, a brute Thamarai came to Subbarayan's village. Being short-tempered, he clashed against the ruthless Subbarayan many times. Thamarai and Poogodai fell in love with each other but the poor palm wine seller Sarasu (Rupini) developed a soft corner for Thamarai. Poogodai later got married with a rich groom and Thamarai went to jail for cutting the hand of the groom's father. The next day, the groom committed suicide.

During the Madurai Veeran temple festival, Subbarayan plans to demolish the Madurai Veeran temple but Thamarai prevents it. In the confrontation, Sarasu died by saving Thamarai. What transpires next forms the rest of the story.

Cast

Napoleon as Thamarai
Rupini as Sarasu, an alcohol seller who loves Thamarai
Rohini as Poongodai, Thamarai’s love interest
Rajesh as Subbarayan, Poongodai’s father
S. S. Chandran as Poosari, Maniarasu’s father and Subbarayan’s sidekick
R. Sundarrajan as Veerappan
Supergood Kannan as Maniarasu, Poosari’s son and Elanji’s love interest
Poorani as Elanji, Maniarasu’s love interest 
Kavitha
Vijaya Chandrika
A. K. Veerasamy as Sangili
Kumarimuthu as Manickam
Thideer Kannaiah
Suryakanth
Krishnamoorthy as Semalai
Nalinikanth
Bayilvan Ranganathan
Vellai Subbaiah
Durai Ramachandran
A. Madhur Swamy
Nadesh
Alex as Parisal

Production
Actor Napoleon, who played villains and character roles until then, signed up to play for the first time the hero role. But the film that first got released in which he had played the hero role was Seevalaperi Pandi.

Soundtrack

The film score and the soundtrack were composed by Deva. The soundtrack, released in 1994, features 6 tracks with lyrics written by Vairamuthu and Deva.

References

1994 films
1990s Tamil-language films
Films scored by Deva (composer)